The 1935 Chico State Wildcats football team represented Chico State College—now known as California State University, Chico—as a member of the Far Western Conference (FWC) during the 1935 college football season. Led by 13th-year head coach Art Acker, Chico State compiled an overall record of 2–5–1 with a mark of 0–4 in conference play, placing last out of five teams in the FWC. The team was outscored by its opponents 94 to 54 for the season. The Wildcats played home games at College Field in Chico, California.

The 1935 Wildcats were led by head coach Art Acker in his 13th year. Chico State finished the season with a record of two wins, five losses and one tie (2–5–1, 0–4 FWC). The Wildcats were outscored by their opponents 54–for the season.

Schedule

References

Chico State
Chico State Wildcats football seasons
Chico State Wildcats football